Cephetola australis is a butterfly in the family Lycaenidae. It is found in Mozambique.

References

Endemic fauna of Mozambique
Butterflies described in 1999
Poritiinae